Nawel Mansouri (born August 1, 1985, in Béjaïa) is an Algerian international volleyball player at the libero position. She has been part of Algeria's Olympic volleyball team twice, in 2008  and 2012.

Club information
Current club :  MB Béjaïa

Current club :  GSP (ex MCA)

Debut club :  NC Béjaïa

References

1985 births
Living people
Volleyball players at the 2008 Summer Olympics
Volleyball players at the 2012 Summer Olympics
Olympic volleyball players of Algeria
Competitors at the 2009 Mediterranean Games
Algerian women's volleyball players
Volleyball players from Béjaïa
Liberos
Mediterranean Games competitors for Algeria
21st-century Algerian women
20th-century Algerian women